Adora may refer to:
Adora (given name)
 Adora (Apocrypha), a town mentioned in the Apocrypha
 Adora, Har Hebron, an Israeli settlement on the West Bank
Adora (singer), South Korean singer-songwriter
 Adora, a novel by Bertrice Small
 Princess Adora, the alter ego of the fictional superheroine She-Ra
 "Adora", a song by Indochine from the album Alice & June